Ex on the Beach Italy is an Italian reality television series that airs on MTV, Sky Italia, and Now TV. The series premiered on September 25, 2018. It features single men and women on a summer vacation, with their exes joining the cast.

In September 2022, Paramount Global announced that it acquired the production rights to the show.

Series overview

Series 1 (2018) 

The first season of the show was announced on July 16, 2018, and premiered on MTV Italy on September 26 of the same year. The official list of cast members, confirmed with a picture posted on social media, includes four single boys and four single girls.

Series 2 (2020) 

The second season of the show premiered on MTV Italy on January 22, 2020. The official list of cast members was confirmed with an image spread on networks, it includes three single boys and four single girls.

Series 3 (2021) 

The third season was announced in June 2021 and premiered on October 13, 2021.

Series 4 (2022) 

On November 16, 2022, MTV announced the fourth season, and premiere on November 30 of that same year. Elettra Lamborghini returns to the program with the role of digital ambassador. It was filmed for the second time on an island in Cartagena, Colombia.

References

External links
 
 

MTV original programming
2018 Italian television series debuts
Italian reality television series
Ex on the Beach
Television shows filmed in Spain
Television shows filmed in Colombia
2010s Italian television series
2020s Italian television series